Waterford is a city in County Waterford in the south-east of Ireland. It is located within the province of Munster. The city is situated at the head of Waterford Harbour. It is the oldest and the fifth most populous city in the Republic of Ireland. It is the ninth most populous settlement on the island of Ireland. Waterford City and County Council is the local government authority for the city. According to the 2016 Census, 53,504 people live in the city, with a wider metropolitan population of 82,963.

Today, Waterford is known for Waterford Crystal, a legacy of the city's former glassmaking industry. Glass, or crystal, was manufactured in the city from 1783 until early 2009 when the factory there was shut down after the receivership of Waterford Wedgwood plc. The Waterford Crystal visitor centre in the Viking Quarter, under new owners, opened in June 2010, after the intervention of Waterford City Council and Waterford Chamber of Commerce, and resumed production. Waterford is also known for being the starting point of Ryanair's first flight, a 14-seat Embraer Bandeirante turboprop aircraft flying between Waterford and London Gatwick Airport.

History

The name 'Waterford' comes . The Irish name is Port Láirge, meaning "Lárag's port".

Viking raiders first established a settlement near Waterford in 853. It and all the other longphorts were vacated in 902, the Vikings having been driven out by the native Irish. The Vikings re-established themselves in Ireland at Waterford in 914, led at first by Ottir Iarla (Jarl Ottar) until 917, and after that by Ragnall ua Ímair and the Uí Ímair dynasty, and built what would be Ireland's first city. Among the most prominent rulers of Waterford was Ivar of Waterford.

In 1167, Diarmait Mac Murchada, the deposed King of Leinster, failed in an attempt to take Waterford. He returned in 1170 with Cambro-Norman mercenaries under Richard de Clare, 2nd Earl of Pembroke (known as Strongbow); together they besieged and took the city after a desperate defence. In furtherance of the Norman invasion of Ireland, King Henry II of England landed at Waterford in 1171. Waterford and then Dublin were declared royal cities, with Dublin also declared the capital of Ireland.

Throughout the medieval period, Waterford was Ireland's second city after Dublin. In the 15th century, Waterford repelled two pretenders to the English throne: Lambert Simnel and Perkin Warbeck. As a result, King Henry VII gave the city its motto: Urbs Intacta Manet Waterfordia (Waterford remains the untaken city).

After the Protestant Reformation, Waterford remained a Catholic city and participated in the confederation of Kilkenny – an independent Catholic government from 1642 to 1649. This was ended abruptly by Oliver Cromwell, who brought the country back under English rule; his son-in-law Henry Ireton finally took Waterford in 1650 after a major siege. 
In 1690, during the Williamite War, the Jacobite Irish Army was forced to surrender Waterford in the wake of the Battle of the Boyne.

The 18th century was a period of huge prosperity for Waterford. Most of the city's best architecture appeared during this time. A permanent military presence was established in the city with the completion of the Cavalry Barracks at the end of the 18th century.

In the early 19th century, Waterford City was deemed vulnerable and the British government erected three Martello towers on the Hook Peninsula to reinforce the existing Fort at Duncannon. During the 19th century, great industries such as glass making and ship building thrived in the city.

The city was represented in the Parliament of the United Kingdom from 1891 to 1918 by John Redmond MP, leader (from January 1900) of the Irish Parliamentary Party. Redmond, then leader of the pro-Parnell faction of the party, defeated David Sheehy in 1891. In 1911, Br. Jerome Foley, Br. Dunstan Drumm and Br. Leopold Loughran left Waterford for Malvern, Australia. Here, they founded a Catholic college which is still in existence today.

In July 1922, Waterford was the scene of fighting between Irish Free State and Irish Republican troops during the Irish Civil War.

References in Annals of Inisfallen
See Annals of Inisfallen (AI)
 AI926.2 The fleet of Port Láirge [came] over land, and they settled on Loch Gair.
 AI927.2 A slaughter of the foreigners of Port Láirge [was inflicted] at Cell Mo-Chellóc by the men of Mumu and by the foreigners of Luimnech.
 AI984.2 A great naval expedition(?) by the sons of Aralt to Port Láirge, and they and the son of Cennétig exchanged hostages there as a guarantee of both together providing a hosting to attack Áth Cliath. The men of Mumu assembled and proceeded to Mairg Laigen, and the foreigners overcame the Uí Cheinnselaig and went by sea; and the men of Mumu, moreover, devastated Osraige in the same year, and its churches, and the churches of Laigin, and the fortifications of both were laid waste, and Gilla Pátraic, son of Donnchadh, was released.
 AI1018.5 Death of Ragnall son of Ímar, king of Port Láirge.
 AI1031.9 Cell Dara and Port Láirge were burned.

Politics

Local government
Following the Local Government Reform Act 2014, Waterford City and County Council is the local government authority for the city and county. The authority came into operation on 1 June 2014. Prior to this the city had its own local council, Waterford City Council. The new Council is the result of a merger of Waterford City Council and Waterford County Council. The council has 32 representatives (councillors) who are elected from six local electoral areas. The city itself forms three of the electoral areas – which when combined form the Metropolitan District of Waterford City – and returns a total of 18 councillors to Waterford City and County Council. The office of the Mayor of Waterford was established in 1377. A mayor is then elected by the councillors from the three electoral areas of the Metropolitan District of Waterford every year, and there is no limit to the number of terms an individual may serve. Mary O'Halloran who was mayor during 2007–2008 was the first woman to hold the post.

National politics
For the elections to Dáil Éireann, the city is part of the 4-seat constituency of Waterford, which includes the city and county of Waterford. For elections to the European Parliament, the county is part of the South constituency.

Notable features
The city is situated at the head of Waterford Harbour ( or ). The city motto Urbs Intacta Manet Waterfordia ("Waterford remains the untaken city") was granted by King Henry VII of England in 1497 after Waterford refused to recognise the claims of the pretenders Lambert Simnel and Perkin Warbeck to the English throne. Waterford was subjected to two sieges in 1649 and 1650, during the Cromwellian conquest of Ireland. It withstood the first siege but surrendered during the second siege to Henry Ireton on 6 August 1650.

Reginald's Tower is the oldest urban civic building in Ireland, and the oldest monument to retain its Viking name. To this day, it remains Waterford's most recognisable landmark. It is believed to be the first building in Ireland to use mortar. The River Suir, which flows through Waterford City, has provided a basis for the city's long maritime history. The place downriver from Waterford where the Nore and the Barrow join the River Suir is known in Irish as Cumar na dTrí Uisce ("The confluence of the three waters"). Waterford Port has been one of Ireland's major ports for over a millennium. In the 19th century, shipbuilding was a major industry. The owners of the Neptune Shipyard, the Malcomson family, built and operated the largest fleet of iron steamers in the world between the mid-1850s and the late 1860s, including five trans-Atlantic passenger liners.

Today, Waterford is known for Waterford Crystal, a legacy of the city's former glass-making industry. Glass, or crystal, was manufactured in the city from 1783 until early 2009 when the factory there was shut down after the receivership of Waterford Wedgwood plc. The Waterford Crystal visitor centre in the Viking Quarter, under new owners, opened in June 2010, after the intervention of Waterford City Council and Waterford Chamber of Commerce, and resumed production.

Waterford is also known for being the "starting point" of one of the biggest European airlines (as of 2013) – Ryanair's first flight was a 14-seat Embraer Bandeirante turboprop aircraft, flying between Waterford and Gatwick Airport.

Geography

Climate
The climate of Waterford is, like the rest of Ireland, classified as a maritime temperate climate (Cfb) according to the Köppen climate classification system. It is mild and changeable with abundant rainfall and a lack of temperature extremes. The counties in the Waterford area are often referred to as the 'Sunny Southeast'. The warmest months of the year are June, July and August with average daytime temperatures of around 17 – 22 degrees. Rainfall is evenly distributed year-round, however, the period from late October to late January is considerably wetter and duller than the rest of the year.

Demographics

With a population of 53,504 and a metropolitan area population of 82,963, Waterford is the fifth most populous city in the State and the 32nd most populous area of local government.

The population of Waterford grew from 1,555 in 1653 to around 28,000 in the early 19th century, declining to just over 20,000 at the end of the 19th, then rising steadily to over 40,000 during the 20th century. According to the 2016 Census, 53,504 people live in the city of Waterford, with a wider metropolitan population of 82,963.

Culture

Religion

Church of Ireland
 Christ Church Cathedral
 Saint Olave's Church, Peter Street (Medieval church)
Methodist
 St Patrick’s Methodist Church, Waterford 
 Waterford Methodist Church, Greyfriars (council purchased in 1988)
Catholic Church
 Cathedral of the Most Holy Trinity
 French Church, a former Franciscan friary
 St Saviour's (Dominican) Church and Priory, Bridge Street. First Dominicans arrived in Waterford in 1226.
 St Patrick's Catholic Church, Jenkin's Lane. One of the earliest surviving post-Reformation churches in Ireland
 Holy Family Catholic Church
 Church of the Most Holy Trinity, Ballybricken
 St Joseph and St Benildus, Catholic Church
Other Christian Denominations
St John's Presbytery (closed)
Waterford Baptist Church 
Anchor Baptist Church, Waterford
Waterford Quaker Meeting House (Newtown Road) 
Maranatha Christian Community Church
Russian Orthodox Parish of St Patrick in Waterford

Public buildings
 Waterford Museum of Treasures, forming the hub of the Viking Triangle, previously housed in the Granary on Merchant's Quay, is now accommodated in two museums on the Mall. The first is housed in the 19th-century Bishop's Palace, on the Mall, which holds items from 1700 to 1970. This was opened in June 2011. The second museum is located next to Bishop's Palace displaying the Medieval history of the city as well as the Chorister's Hall.
 As well as the above, The Mall now contains Reginald's Tower, The House of Waterford Crystal, Christchurch Cathedral, and the Theatre Royal among various other historical landmarks.
 Reginald's Tower, the oldest urban civic building in the country, is situated on the Quays/The Mall, in Waterford. It has performed numerous functions over the years and today is a civic museum.
 A museum at Mount Sion (Barrack Street) is dedicated to the story of Brother Edmund Ignatius Rice and the history of the Christian Brothers and Presentation Brothers. Along with the museum, there is a café and a new chapel. The new museum was designed by Janvs Design
 Waterford Gallery of Art, the home of the Waterford Art Collection, is located at 31-32 O’Connell Street. This former bank building was built in 1845 and now serves as a facility comprising galleries, outreach spaces, offices, and meeting and workshop rooms. The building was designed by the Waterford-born architect Thomas Jackson (1807 - 1890). Architecturally, this classical style bank building retains many of its original features and is a significant reminder of the prosperity present within the area in the mid-nineteenth century. The building is distinguished by the fine cut-stone detailing throughout, as can be seen at the main entrance, stairs and fireplace which is located on the first floor.    
 The Theatre Royal on The Mall, was built in 1876, as part of a remodelled section of City Hall. It is a U-shaped, Victorian theatre, seating about 600 people.
 Garter Lane Arts Centre is housed in two conserved 18th-century buildings on O'Connell Street. Garter Lane Gallery, the 18th-century townhouse of Samuel Barker contains the gallery and the Bausch & Lomb Dance Studio, and Garter Lane Theatre is based in the Quaker Meeting House, built in 1792. The theatre was renovated and restored in 2006 and now contains a 164-seat auditorium.
 St. John's College, Waterford was a Catholic seminary founded in 1807 for the diocese, in the 1830s the college established a mission to Newfoundland in Canada. It closed as a seminary in 1999 and in 2007 much of its building and lands were sold to the Respond! Housing Association.

Events

 The Waterford Film Festival was established in 2007 by local filmmaker Stephen Byrne. His objective was to bring something new to Waterford's arts and cultural scene, promoting local and national filmmakers and writers, but in particular independent film.
 Waterford Music Fest, launched in 2011, is an outdoor, one-day music event which takes place in the heart of Waterford City during the summer. In 2011 Waterford Music Fest, organised by Music Events Ireland, was headlined by 50 Cent, Flo Rida and G-Unit. Over 10,000 people attended the 2011 event.
 Spraoi festival, (pronounced 'Spree') organised by the Spraoi Theatre Company, is a professional festival and street art organisation which takes over the city centre of Waterford on the August Bank Holiday Weekend. It attracts audiences in excess of 80,000 people to the city.
 Waterford International Festival of Light Opera is an annual event that has been held in the Theatre Royal since 1959. It has recently been rebranded as the Waterford International Festival of Music and now takes place in November.
 Tall Ships Festival, held in Waterford in 2005, marked the start of the Tall Ships race of that year. The Suir river provided the berthing location for the tall ships (up to 90) that lined the north and south quays for almost a week. The festival attracted in the region of 450,000 people to the city. Waterford hosted the start of the Tall Ships race again in 2011.
 Waterford Harvest Food Festival takes place annually in September along the Quays. The festival offers visitors demonstrations, workshops and tours of local producers, numerous markets, tastings and dinners.
 St. Patrick's Day parade takes place annually on 17 March.
 There are two Arts Festivals of note in the city: The Imagine Arts Festival in October and The Fringe Arts Festival in September.
 Waterford Winterval an annual Christmas festival held in the city centre.

 Waterford Walls is an event celebrating street art annually each August since 2014. Street artists both domestic and international are invited to the city to practise and display their craft.

Arts
 Theatre companies. There are three theatre companies, Red Kettle, Spraoi and Waterford Youth Arts. Red Kettle is a professional theatre company based in Waterford that regularly performs in Garter Lane Theatre. Spraoi is a street theatre company based in Waterford. It produces the Spraoi festival and has participated regularly in the Waterford and Dublin St. Patrick's day parades, often winning best float. In January 2005 the company staged its biggest and most prestigious production to date, "Awakening", the Opening Show for Cork 2005 European Capital of Culture. Waterford Youth Arts (WYA), formerly known as Waterford Youth Drama, was established in August 1985. WYA has grown from the voluntary efforts of two individuals and 25 young people to a fully structured youth arts organisation with a paid staff and 400 young people taking part each week. Notable playwrights include Jim Nolan, who co-founded Red Kettle Theatre Company. The Theatre Royal Waterford dates back to 1785.
 Libraries There are three public libraries in the city, all operated by Waterford City Council: Central Library, in Lady Lane; Ardkeen Library, in the Ardkeen shopping centre on Dunmore Road; and Brown's Road Library, on Paddy Brown's Road. Central Library, or Waterford City Library, opened in 1905. It was the first of many Irish libraries funded by businessman Andrew Carnegie (Carnegie funded 2,509 libraries across the world). It was renovated in 2004 for its centenary.
 The Barrack Street Concert Band A band established in 1870 and is one of the only bands in Ireland to have unbroken service through a civil war and two World Wars. They have a long and rich history. In 1982 they changed their name to The Barrack Street Concert Band. The new name reflected a change in instrumentation including flutes, saxophones, oboes and a full percussion section which led to more members joining and a wider variety of music being played. In 1994 the band won the All Ireland Senior Military Band Championships in Wesley college, Dublin under the Baton of Mr Niall O'Connor and 10 years later, in 2004, the band won the South of Ireland Senior Military band Championships in Clonakilty Co Cork under the Baton of the band's current musical director Mr Mark Fitzgerald.
 Waterford Film For All (WFFA) is a non-profit film society whose aim is to offer an alternative to the cineplex experience in Waterford. WFFA conducts much of its activities on the Waterford Institute of Technology (WIT) campus.
 The Waterford Collection of Art.  Formerly known as The Waterford Municipal Art Collection, the collection is acknowledged as one of the oldest and best municipal collections of art in Ireland. Originally founded as the Waterford Art Museum in 1939, the collection has grown considerably since and it now comprises over 500 works of art including works by: Paul Henry, Jack B. Yeats, Mainie Jellett, Louis Le Brocquy, Letitia Hamilton, Dermod O’Brien, Evie Hone, Mary Swanzy, Charles Lamb, Hilda Roberts, Seán Keating, and George Russell (aka. AE), as well as contemporary acquisitions of work by Michael (Ben) Hennessy, Breda Lynch, Hughie O’Donoghue, Donald Teskey, and Kathleen Delaney.
 Cinema – Odeon Cinema in the Railway Square complex. Omniplex Cinema-Patrick Street

Media

RTÉs southeastern studio is in the city.

Waterford Local Radio (WLR FM) is available on 94.8FM on the Coast, 95.1FM in the County and on 97.5FM in Waterford City. WLR FM is Waterford's local radio station. Beat 102 103 is a regional youth radio station broadcasting across the South East of Ireland, it is based in Ardkeen, along with sister station WLR FM.

The Waterford News & Star is based on Gladstone Street in Waterford City. It covers Waterford city and county. It is now published in tabloid format.

The Munster Express has its office on the Quay in Waterford City and covers stories from across the city and county. It switched to tabloid format in 2011.

Waterford Mail is a free newspaper that comes out on Thursdays, it has an office on O'Connell Street. Its circulation is currently 20,000 and it delivers to homes and businesses across the city and county.

Waterford Today is an advertising-supported free newspaper. It is delivered to most homes in the Waterford city area and is also available in many shops across the east of the county. Its newly refurbished offices are on Mayors Walk in the city.

Waterford News and Star is in the shops on Tuesdays, The Munster Express, and Waterford Today are in the shops on Wednesdays.

Places of interest

The city of Waterford consists of various cultural quarters, the oldest of which is known as Viking Triangle. This is the part of the city surrounded by the original tenth-century fortifications and is triangular in shape, with its apex at Reginald's Tower. Though this was once the site of a thriving Viking city, the city centre has shifted to the west over the years, and it is now a quiet and tranquil area, dominated by narrow streets, medieval architecture, and civic spaces. Over the past decade, a number of restaurants have opened on High Street and Henrietta Street, taking advantage of the charming character of the area. Much of Waterford's impressive architecture is to be found in the 'Viking Triangle'.

In the 15th century, the city was enlarged with the building of an outer wall on the west side. Today Waterford retains more of its city walls than any other city in Ireland with the exception of Derry, whose walls were built much later. Tours of Waterford's city walls are conducted daily.

The Quay, once termed by historian Mark Girouard 'the noblest quay in Europe', is a mile long from Grattan Quay to Adelphi Quay, though Adelphi Quay is now a residential area. It is still a major focal point for Waterford, commercially and socially, and is the face that Waterford presents to those travelling into the city from the north. Near Reginald's Tower is the William Vincent Wallace Plaza, a monument and amenity built around the time of the millennium that commemorates the Waterford-born composer.

John Roberts Square is a pedestrianised area that is one of the main focal points of Waterford's modern-day commercial centre. It was named after the city's most celebrated architect, John Roberts, and was formed from the junction of Barronstrand Street, Broad Street and George's Street. It is often referred to locally as Red Square, due to the red paving that was used when the area was first pedestrianised. A short distance to the east of John Roberts Square is Arundel Square, another square with a fine commercial tradition, which the City Square shopping centre opens onto.

Ballybricken, in the west, just outside the city walls, is thought to have been Waterford's Irishtown, a type of settlement that often formed outside Irish cities to house the Vikings and Irish that had been expelled during the Norman invasion of Ireland. Modern street names in the area reflect the fact that the area was where inhabitants of the medieval city practised archery. Ballybricken is an inner-city neighbourhood with a long tradition, centred around Ballybricken hill, which was a large, open market-square. Today it has been converted into a green, civic space, but the Bull Post, where livestock was once bought and sold, still stands as a remnant of the hill's past.

The Mall is a fine Georgian thoroughfare, built by the Wide Streets Commission to extend the city southwards. It contains some of the city's finest Georgian architecture. The People's Park, Waterford's largest and finest park, is located nearby.

Once a historic market area, the city's Apple Market district is popular for its nightlife culture and includes a number of bars, restaurants and nightclubs. A significant investment in the mid-2010s saw a portion of the area pedestrianised and the installation of a large outdoor roofing section.

Ferrybank, in County Waterford, is Waterford's only suburb north of the river. It contains a village centre of its own.

In April 2003 an important site combining a fifth-century Iron Age and ninth-century Viking settlement was discovered at Woodstown near the city, which appears to have been a Viking town that predates all such settlements in Ireland.

Waterford Crystal is manufactured in Waterford but in early 2009 the company moved its operations to continental Europe. A new Waterford Crystal visitor centre opened on 22 June 2010.

Waterford's oldest public house (pub) can be found just outside the old 'Viking Triangle'. T & H Doolan's, of 31/32 George's Street, has been officially active and open to the public for over three hundred years. The official record of licences dates back to the 18th century but the premises is believed to be closer to five hundred years in age. A main element of the structure includes one of the original city walls, almost 1,000 years old, which can be viewed in the lounge area of the building.

Economy
Waterford is the main city of Ireland's South-East Region. Historically Waterford was an important trading port which brought much prosperity to the city throughout the city's eventful history. Throughout its history, Waterford Crystal provided employment to thousands in the city and surrounding areas.

Waterford Port is Ireland's closest deep-water port to mainland Europe, handling approximately 12% of Ireland's external trade by value. Waterford's most famous export, Waterford Crystal, is an internationally known and highly sought after product that was manufactured in the city from 1783 to 2009 and again from 2010 to the present day. Places, where Waterford Crystal can be seen, include New York City, where Waterford Crystal made the 2,668 crystals for the famous New Year's Eve Ball that is dropped each year in Times Square; Westminster Abbey; Windsor Castle; and the Kennedy Center (Washington, DC).

Agriculture played an important part in Waterford's economic history. Kilmeadan, about 5 km from the city, was home to a very successful co-operative. The farmers of the area benefited from the sale of their produce (mostly butter and milk) to the co-op. In 1964, all of the co-ops in Waterford amalgamated to become Waterford Co-op. This led to the construction of a cheese factory on a greenfield site opposite the general store, and Kilmeadan cheese was to become one of the most recognised and successful Cheddar brands in the world, winning gold and bronze medals in the World Cheese Awards in London in 2005.

The Irish economic recession from 2008 onwards has had a major negative impact on Waterford's economy. A number of multinational companies have closed, including Waterford Crystal (which subsequently reopened) and Talk Talk, which has led to a high level of unemployment. Until 2013 the hedge fund office of the Citibank resided here.

Waterford Co-op and Avonmore Co-op have merged to form Glanbia plc.

Transport

The M9 motorway, which was completed on 9 September 2010, connects the city to Dublin. The N24 road connects the city to Limerick city. The N25 road connects the city to Cork city. The route traverses the River Suir via the River Suir Bridge. This cable-stayed bridge is the longest single bridge span in Ireland at 230m. The route continues eastwards to Rosslare Harbour.

Waterford railway station is the only railway station in the county of Waterford. It is operated by Iarnród Éireann and provides 8 daily return services to Dublin and a Monday–Saturday Intercity service to Limerick Junction via Clonmel with onward connections to Limerick, Ennis, Athenry, Galway, Cork, Killarney, and Tralee. The line between Waterford and Rosslare Harbour ceased passenger services in 2010 and was replaced by Bus Éireann route 370. The station is directly connected to Waterford Port (Belview). A freight yard is located at the Dublin/Limerick end of the station, served by freight traffic such as cargo freight and timber which travel to and from Dublin Port and Ballina. In November 2016 it was revealed the Waterford could lose its connection to Limerick Junction by 2018 with the closure of the Limerick Junction Waterford line by CIE/IE to save money as the line is low demand. On 29 May 2018 the contract held by DFDS for a freight service from Ballina to Belview Port expired and was not renewed. In 2021 a new Ballina to Waterford (Belview) by Iarnród Éireann and XPO Logistics, (this is in addition to the wood pulp service from Ballina and Westport).

Bus Éireann, JJ Kavanagh and Sons, Dublin Coach, and Wexford Bus provide bus services around the city centre and to other towns and cities in Ireland. A daily coach service to England via South Wales and terminating at Victoria Coach Station, London is operated by Eurolines. All regional bus services depart from Waterford Bus Station on the quay, and city centre services run throughout the city. Planning for bus lanes in the city centre are at an early stage and bus lanes will be on Parnell Street, Manor Street, The Mall, and the South Quays.  A bus lane will be in each direction.  On street parking will be removed from Parnell Street to facilitate the lanes.  This is part of the city centre green plan.

The Waterford Greenway is Ireland's longest greenway, and connects the city with Mount Congreve, Kilmeaden, Kilmacthomas, and Dungarvan.

Waterford Airport is located 9 km outside the city centre.

Education

The city is served by 21 primary schools, nine secondary schools, a further education college and a university.

Secondary schools
The secondary schools include: 
 Mount Sion Secondary and Primary School at Barrack Street were founded by Edmund Ignatius Rice and the schools have seen many well-known pupils pass through their doors.
 Newtown School, a Quaker co-educational boarding school, is situated in Waterford.
 Waterpark College is a secondary school in Waterford. Established in 1892 on the banks of the River Suir as Waterford's first classical school, it still provides a secondary education to boys and girls from Waterford City, county and the surrounding area. It has only recently become a co-educational school.
 De La Salle College, a secondary school with 1,200 students and over 90 staff, is the biggest all-boys school in the county. Founded by the De La Salle brothers in 1892, it is a Catholic school for boys. Today its large staff is made up of a mixture of Brothers and lay teachers.

Further education
 Waterford College of Further Education previously called the Central Technical Institute (CTI), is a Post Leaving Certificate institute located on Parnell Street, Waterford city. It was founded in 1906 and thus celebrated its centenary in 2005.

University
 South East Technological University - the Waterford campus of the university is located in the city. This was established in 2022 from a merger of Waterford Institute of Technology and Institute of Technology, Carlow.

Sport

Waterford Boat Club is the oldest active sports club in Waterford, established in 1878. Located on Scotch Quay, the club competes in the Irish Rowing Championships. In 2009, several Waterford rowers were selected to row for Ireland.

There are three athletics clubs: West Waterford AC, Waterford Athletic Club and Ferrybank Athletic Club. The Waterford Viking Marathon is held in June. St. Anne's Waterford Lawn Tennis Club, established in 1954, is the result of the amalgamation of Waterford Lawn Tennis Club and St. Anne's Lawn Tennis Club. It has nine courts to cater for social and competitive players in all age groups.

Waterford is home to several association football clubs, including Waterford FC, Benfica W.S.C. and Johnville F.C. Waterford F.C. is a member of the League of Ireland, Benfica is one of the oldest women's football clubs in the Republic of Ireland, while Johnville F.C. is a notable academy club. Notable Waterford footballers include Davy Walsh, Paddy Coad, Jim Beglin, Alfie Hale, Eddie Nolan, John O'Shea James Coade and Daryl Murphy. John Delaney, chief executive of the Football Association of Ireland, is originally from Waterford.

There are two rugby union clubs in Waterford City: Waterford City R.F.C. and Waterpark R.F.C.

Other team sports include Gaelic Athletic Association with clubs such as Mount Sion GAA, Erin's Own GAA, De La Salle GAA, Roanmore GAA, Ferrybank GAA and Ballygunner GAA; cricket is represented by Waterford District Cricket Club who are based in Carraiganore and competes in the Munster Cricket Union; there are two inline hockey clubs, Waterford Shadows HC and Waterford Vikings, both of which compete in the Irish Inline Hockey League; and American football is played by Waterford Wolves, based at the Waterford Regional Sports Centre, and is the only American football club in Waterford.

Notable people

Arts
 Laetitia Marie Wyse Bonaparte (1831–1902), French poet
 Brendan Bowyer (1938–2020) showband singer
 Charles Clagget (1740–ca.1795), composer and inventor
 Frances Emilia Crofton (1822–1910), an artist born in Waterford
 Val Doonican (1927–2015), singer and TV presenter
 Seán Dunne (1956–1995), poet
 Richard Harry Graves (1897–1971), Irish-born Australian poet and novelist
 Gilbert O'Sullivan (born 1946), singer-songwriter
 Mario Rosenstock (born 1971), comedian and musician
 Louis Stewart (guitarist) (1944–2016), jazz guitarist
 Luke Wadding (1588–1657), Franciscan friar, author and historian
 William Vincent Wallace (1812–1865), composer

Politics
 William Hobson (1792–1842), Irish-born New Zealand politician and writer
 Thomas Meagher (1796–1874), politician and businessman
 Thomas Francis Meagher (1823–1867), politician and soldier
 Richard Mulcahy (1886–1971), soldier and politician
 Thomas Wyse (1791–1862), politician and diplomat

Sport
 Jim Beglin (born 1963), association footballer
 John Keane (1917–1975), hurler
 Sean Kelly (born 1956), cyclist
 Fiona O'Brien (born 1988), rugby player
 John O'Shea (born 1981), association footballer
 Paul Flynn (born 1974), hurler

Military
 John Condon (British Army soldier) (c 1896–1915), soldier
 Edmund Fowler (1861–1926), soldier, recipient of the Victoria Cross
 Patrick Mahoney (1827–1857), soldier, recipient of the Victoria Cross

Other
 Marguerite Moore (1849–1933), orator, patriot, activist
 Harry Power (1819–1891), Australian bushranger

See also

 Blaa – A doughy, white bread roll particular to Waterford City.
 John's River – A river that runs through Waterford City.
 Little Island – An island within Waterford City.
 People's Park – Waterford's largest park and green space.
 The Three Sisters: The River Barrow, River Nore and River Suir
 Woodstown – Early Viking Settlement discovered near Waterford in 2003, on the banks of the River Suir
 List of twin towns and sister cities in the Republic of Ireland
 Waterford Greenway - a hiking and cycling trail connecting Waterford City with Dungarvan.

Notes

References

External links

 Waterford City Council

914 establishments
 
Baronies of County Waterford
Cities in the Republic of Ireland
Munster
Populated coastal places in the Republic of Ireland
Viking Age populated places
10th-century establishments in Ireland
Populated places established in the 10th century
Port cities and towns in the Republic of Ireland